JDS Tachikaze (DDG-168) is the lead ship of the Tachikaze-class destroyer built for the Japan Maritime Self-Defense Force (JMSDF).

Development 
Tachikaze-class destroyers were designed almost exclusively as anti-aircraft platforms. No helicopter facilities are provided, and the ASW armament is confined to ASROC missiles and Mk 46 torpedoes. In order to save on construction costs the class adopted the propulsion plant and machinery of the Haruna-class destroyers.

Construction and career 
She was laid down on the 19 June, 1973 in Mitsubishi shipyard in Nagasaki. She was launched on 12 December 1974, and commissioned on 26 March 1976. She was decommissioned on 15 July 2007.

From November 1st to December 17th, 1980, she participated in Hawaii dispatch training with the escort vessels JDS Kikuzuki, JDS Mochizuki and eight P-2Js. This year, the anti-aircraft radar (OPS-11), which was not equipped at the time of commissioning, was equipped.

Participated in the Exercise RIMPAC 1982. 

After that, she participated in Exercise RIMPAC 1986.

She participated in Exercise RIMPAC 1992.

She participated in Exercise RIMPAC 1996.

In 1998, JDS Tachikaze was converted to be the flagship of the Fleet Escort Force. The aft 5-inch gun was replaced with a fleet command area. JDS Sawakaze then succeeded her in the flagship role after her decommissioning.

During the live ammunition training conducted in the southeastern waters of Hachijojima from June 5 to 8, 2009, she became a target ship for multiple ships and aircraft and was sunk.

Gallery

References

External links
 Military Factory

1974 ships
Tachikaze-class destroyers
Ships built by Mitsubishi Heavy Industries